Integrin beta-7 is an integrin protein that in humans is encoded by the ITGB7 gene. It can pair with ITGA4 (CD49d) to form the heterodimeric integrin receptor αβ, or with ITGAE (CD103) to form αβ.

Structure 

Like all integrin subunits, β is a highly flexible, membrane-bound, extracellular protein that must pair with an α subunit for stability. The molecule's flexibility allows it to dynamically regulate its affinity for ligand through conformational changes. Beginning with the apical end of the protein, farthest from the cell membrane, the β is composed of a head and upper legs, collectively known as the headpiece, lower legs, a transmembrane domain and a cytoplasmic tail. The top of the head is the I-like domain, sometimes called the βI domain, which, in combination with the α subunit, binds ligand. Just below this is the hybrid domain, a portion of which is N-terminal to the I-like domain.  Below the hybrid domain is the PSI domain, which completes the headpiece.  The lower legs consist of EGF domains 1-4 and the β tail domain. Finally there is a transmembrane domain, and the C-terminal cytoplasmic tail.

Interactions 

ITGB7 has been shown to interact with EED.

References

Further reading

External links 
ITGB7 Info with links in the Cell Migration Gateway 

Integrins